Jason W. Neyers is a Canadian legal scholar and professor at the University of Western Ontario.

Background 
Jason Neyers was born in Cambridge, Ontario in 1973. Neyers received his Bachelor of Arts and Bachelor of Laws at the University of Western Ontario and a Master of Studies at the University of Oxford. Neyers' works discuss Canadian tort law, private law, and contract law.

Bibliography 
Per OCLC WorldCat.

Books 

 Understanding Unjust Enrichment - 
 Exploring Contract Law - 
 Emerging Issues in Tort Law - 
 Tort Law: Challenging Orthodoxy -

Articles 

 Cases and Materials on Contracts, 6th ed (Toronto: Emond Montgomery, 2018).
 “Reconceptualising the Tort of Public Nuisance” [2017] Cambridge Law Journal 87.
 “Tate & Lyle, Pure Economic Loss and The Modern Tort of Public Nuisance” (2016) 53 Alberta Law Review 1031 (with A Botterell).
 “Loss of Custom and Public Nuisance: The Authority of Ricket” (2016) Lloyd’s Maritime and Commercial Law Quarterly 135 (with E Andrews). 
 “Causing Loss by Unlawful Means: Should the High Court of Australia follow OBG Ltd v Allan?” in S Degeling, J Edelman & J Goudkamp eds, Torts in Commercial Law (Sydney, Thomson Reuters, 2012)
 “What (is) a Nuisance?” (2011) 90 Canadian Bar Review 215.
 “The Economic Torts as Corrective Justice” (2009) 17 Torts Law Journal 162.
 “Rights-Based Justifications for the Tort of Unlawful Interference with Economic Relations” (2008) 28 Legal Studies 215.
 “Explaining the Principled Exception to Privity of Contract” (2007) 52 McGill Law Journal 757

See also 

 Delaware Mansions Ltd v City of Westminster

References

External links 

 Professional webpage
 ResearchGate profile

1973 births
Living people
Canadian legal scholars
Academic staff of the University of Western Ontario
University of Western Ontario alumni
Alumni of the University of Oxford